The Rainbow Aerotrike is a family of South African two-seat ultralight trikes, made by Rainbow Aircraft of Edenvale, Gauteng and available in kit form for amateur construction or fully assembled. The type has been noted for its long-distance flights.

Design and development
The current Aerotrike series comprises two variants of the same basic design, the Scout and Cobra. Both share the same basic design, including the two-seat carriage frame, suspension, steering and folding inverted "V" mast assembly. The Scout is equipped minimally, while the Cobra has many options as standard equipment, including a cockpit pod fairing, windshield, instrument panel, saddle bags and wheel pants.

Both models require 30–40 hours to assemble from the supplied kit.

Operational history
The Aerotrike series were the choice of Mike Blyth for his record long-distance flights.

Variants
Cobra
Fully equipped version with full cockpit fairing. Standard engine is  Rotax 912UL four-stroke with the  Rotax 912ULS optional. It was previously available with the  Rotax 582 two-stroke powerplant. The standard wing is the Aeros Stream 16.2, with the Aeros Proto 15.5 and La Mouette wings as optional. Still in production, 70 had been completed and flown by 2005.
Naked Cobra
Cobra trike, but without the cockpit fairing included, making the aircraft lighter and less expensive.
Safari
Very basic model without cockpit fairing. Standard engine is  Rotax 503  with the  Rotax 582 two-stroke optional. When it was still in production the  Rotax 618 was available. The standard wing is the Aerotrike Spirit 14.8. Out of production, 45 had been completed and flown as of 2000.
Scout
Basic-equipped version without cockpit fairing, but with suspension. Standard engine is  Rotax 503  with the  Rotax 582 two-stroke or  HKS 700E four-stroke engine optional. When it was still in production the  Rotax 618 was available as well. The standard wing is the Aerotrike Spirit 14.8, with the Aerotrike Spirit 16.2, La-Mouette Ghost 12.9, La Mouette Ghost 14.9 and La-Mouette Chronos 16 wings as optional. Still in production, 45 had been completed and flown as of 2000.
Spirit
Fully equipped version with full cockpit fairing. Standard engine is  Rotax 582 two-stroke. No longer in production.

Specifications (Scout with Spirit 14.8 wing)

See also

References

External links

1990s South African ultralight aircraft
Ultralight trikes